John Poland (born 21 November 1996) is an Irish rugby union player. He plays as a scrum-half for the New England Free Jacks in Major League Rugby (MLR) in the United States.

Early life
Born in Ballinora, County Cork, the second eldest of four children, Poland first played rugby for Sundays Well, where his father had also been a player, and attended Presentation Brothers College, captaining the team during the Munster Schools Rugby Senior Cup. He also played hurling and football for Ballinora GAA, where he played on several inter-county development sides. Initially, he played as a fly-half or centre, before converting to scrum-half. Poland has been capped at under-19 and Under-20 level for Ireland, and joined the Munster sub-academy in July 2015.

Club rugby
Poland played his club rugby with Cork Constitution during the 2015–16 and 2016–17 seasons, winning several trophies while there. He moved to UCC ahead of the 2017–18 season and was an integral part of the side that was promoted to the division 1A of the All-Ireland League for the 2018–19 season.

Professional career

Munster
Poland was an integral part of the Munster A team that won the 2016–17 British and Irish Cup. He was used as a replacement in round 1 against London Welsh, missed the round 3 clash against Rotherham Titans due to exam commitments, was used as a replacement again in round 4 against Rotherham, before starting against Doncaster Knights in the rescheduled round 2 and round 5, Ulster A in the quarter-final, Ealing Trailfinders in the semi-final and Jersey Reds in the final. Poland made his senior competitive debut for Munster on 10 February 2018, coming off the bench in the provinces' 33–5 win against Zebre in the 2017–18 Pro14.

New England Free Jacks
Poland joined American Major League Rugby side New England Free Jacks in October 2019 upon concluding his degree in finance at University College Cork, in time for the sides inaugural season in 2020. He scored four tries in the 5 regular season games and had 4 try assists. Poland scored a brilliant individual try which was awarded try of the week in week 4.

Ireland
Poland was capped for Ireland U20 during the 2016 Six Nations Under 20s Championship, earning the Man-of-the-Match award during the sides opening 35–24 loss to Wales U20 on 5 February 2016.

Honours

Munster A
British and Irish Cup:
Winner (1): 2016–17

Cork Constitution
All-Ireland League Division 1A:
Winner (1): 2016–17
Bateman Cup:
Winner (2): 2015–16, 2016–17
Munster Senior Cup:
Winner (2): 2015–16, 2016–17
All Ireland U20 League:
Winner (1): 2016–17

University College Cork
All-Ireland League Division 1B:
Winner (1): 2017–18

References

External links
New England Free Jacks Profile
Munster A Profile
U20 Six Nations Profile

Living people
1996 births
Rugby union players from County Cork
People educated at Presentation Brothers College, Cork
Irish rugby union players
Sundays Well RFC players
Cork Constitution players
University College Cork RFC players
Munster Rugby players
New England Free Jacks players
Irish expatriate rugby union players
Expatriate rugby union players in the United States
Irish expatriate sportspeople in the United States
Rugby union scrum-halves